The 2020 U-23 Baseball World Cup, officially III U-23 Baseball World Cup, is the third edition of the U-23 Baseball World Cup tournament, fourth since the tournament's inception in 2014 as the 21U Baseball World Cup. Originally scheduled to take place in 2020, the event was postponed to 2021 as a result of the COVID-19 pandemic. The tournament is held from September 23 to October 2, in Ciudad Obregón and Hermosillo, Mexico, with 12 teams participating.

Consequently, the World Baseball Softball Confederation (WBSC) has expanded the age category to include players up to the age of 24 who would have missed the competition in 2020, and players born from 1997 to 2003 will be eligible to participate.

Venezuela defeated Mexico with a score of 4-0 in the world championship game at Estadio Sonora. Colombia won the bronze medal against Cuba with a 5-3 score.

Venues
This edition was played in two Mexican baseball temples. Estadio Yaquis in Ciudad Obregón hosted Group A and the Placement Round, while Estadio Sonora in Hermosillo hosted Group B, the Super Round, the Bronze Medal Game and the Championship Game.

Teams 
The WBSC World Rankings as of the time of the competition is specified in parentheses.

Asia

  (3)
  (2)

Europe

  (8)
  (16)
  (18)

Americas

  (10)
  (5)
  (15)
  (6)
  (11)
  (14)
  (13)

First round
The top three teams in each pool will qualify for the final round.

Group A

H: Host
 All times are Mountain Standard Time (UTC-07:00).

|}

Group B

 All times are Mountain Standard Time (UTC-07:00).

|}

Consolation round

 All times are Mountain Standard Time (UTC-07:00).

|}

Super Round

H: Host

 All times are Mountain Standard Time (UTC-07:00).

|}

Finals

Third place game

|}

Championships

|}

Final standings

U-23 All-World Team

References

External links

U-23 Baseball World Cup
2021 in baseball
International baseball competitions hosted by Mexico
Baseball World Cup
U-23 Baseball World Cup
U-23 Baseball World Cup
Sport in Hermosillo
Ciudad Obregón